The Four Days of Dunkirk is road bicycle race around the Nord-Pas de Calais region of northern France.  Despite the name of the race, since the addition of an individual time trial in 1963, the race has been held over a 5 or 6 day period for most of its history. Since 2005, the race has been organised as a 2.HC event on the UCI Europe Tour. The race will become part of the new UCI ProSeries in 2020. Belgian cyclist Philippe Gilbert won the most recent edition of the race.

List of overall winners

Multiple winners
Riders in italics are still active

Wins per country

External links
 Wielersite
 

 
Cycle races in France
Recurring sporting events established in 1955
1955 establishments in France
Sport in Dunkirk
UCI Europe Tour races
Super Prestige Pernod races